The women's 200 metre butterfly event at the 2018 Commonwealth Games was held on 9 April at the Gold Coast Aquatic Centre.

Records
Prior to this competition, the existing world, Commonwealth and Games records were as follows:

The following records were established during the competition:

Results

Heats
The heats were held at 11:42.

Final
The final was held at 21:28.

References

Women's 200 metre butterfly
Commonwealth Games
Common